Treachery is the betrayal or violation of trust.

Treachery may also refer to:

Treachery (law), an offence in several countries, related to treason
Treachery (Revenge), the eighth episode of the American television series Revenge
Treachery (film), a film written and directed by Travis Romero and starring Michael Biehn
The Dark Tower: Treachery, the Stephen King comic book series
An Old Norse word for Sköll, a wolf in Norse mythology

See also
Treacherous (disambiguation)
Treason